Anibare Bay is a large bay located in the Anibare District of eastern Nauru island.

Physical features

It is bordered by capes to the north and south, in Ijuw and Meneng districts respectively.

Its Anibare Beach is in excess of two kilometers long.  
Anibare Bay was formed by the underwater collapse of the east side of the volcano that underlies Nauru. A large arc shaped block slid away from the side of Nauru and rotated out.  This block extends to about 1100 m below sea level, with rough bulging landslide deposits down to 2000 m below sea level.

Natural ripcurrent hazards
While Anibare Bay is popular with tourists and naturalists, it can be at times dangerous owing to frequent heavy surf and the presence of rip currents.

Anibare Bay Escarpment Important Bird Area
The Anibare Bay escarpment is a line of wooded cliffs overlooking the bay. It ranges in gradient from vertical cliffs to gradually sloping areas, and contains the richest remaining native vegetation on the island. It forms a 35 ha site which has been recognised as an Important Bird Area (IBA) by BirdLife International because it is reported to hold the highest density of endemic Nauru reed warblers on the island, as well as supporting tree-nesting seabirds such as black noddies. Ity is likely to be a nesting site for Micronesian imperial pigeons, if any still remain.

Noted industries
Noted industries include the government-owned Menen Hotel, and Anibare Harbour, an artificial commercial fishing area which was created in 2000.
Anibare Beach resort tourism Development was proposed and approved on 24 Aug 2021.The project is meant to boost hospitality and tourism and income growth for Nauru.The planning is managed and supervised by GIP and led by CEO Troy Spenser.

See also
 Anibare District#Tourism

References

Bays of Nauru
Important Bird Areas of Nauru